The 2017–18 FA WSL was the seventh edition of the FA WSL since it was formed in 2010. It was the first season of WSL which ran as a winter league. It started in September 2017 and ended in May 2018, with ten teams competing in both leagues.

The Football Association removed promotion and relegation between the two tiers for the end of the season. The league was instead restructured, with clubs required to apply for licenses under new criteria for the top tier in the 2018–19 season.

A one-off competition, the FA WSL Spring Series, ran from February to May 2017 to bridge the gap from the 2016 FA WSL season.

Teams
With the collapse of Notts County Ladies just prior to the Spring Series, the ten clubs of WSL2 were invited to apply for a place in the 2017–18 season. Two sides, champions Everton and runners-up Doncaster Rovers, applied. On 9 June 2017, subject to appeal, Everton were awarded the position.

WSL 1

WSL 2

WSL 1

Ten teams competed this season. Following the closure of Notts County Ladies in April 2017, the FA announced that one place in the league would be given to a team which competed in the Spring Series, based on an evaluation by the FA of applicant clubs' business plans, budget, youth development, facilities and on-pitch performance. The place was subsequently given to Everton.

There was no relegation based on results at the end of the season due to the league's restructure.

Table

Results

Top goalscorers

WSL 2

Ten teams competed during this season.

There was no promotion or relegation based on results at the end of the season due to the league's restructure.

Table

Results

Top goalscorers

See also
2017–18 FA WSL Cup

References

External links
Official website

Women's Super League seasons
1
2017–18 domestic women's association football leagues